The Capetian House of Anjou or House of Anjou-Sicily, was a royal house and cadet branch of the direct French House of Capet, part of the Capetian dynasty. It is one of three separate royal houses referred to as Angevin, meaning "from Anjou" in France. Founded by Charles I of Anjou, the youngest son of Louis VIII of France, the Capetian king first ruled the Kingdom of Sicily during the 13th century. Later the War of the Sicilian Vespers forced him out of the island of Sicily, leaving him with the southern half of the Italian Peninsula — the Kingdom of Naples. The house and its various branches would go on to influence much of the history of Southern and Central Europe during the Middle Ages, until becoming defunct in 1435.

Historically, the House ruled the counties of Anjou, Maine, Touraine, Provence and Forcalquier, the principalities of Achaea and Taranto, and the kingdoms of Sicily, Naples, Hungary, Croatia, Albania, and Poland.

Rise of Charles I and his sons

A younger son of House of Capet king Louis VIII of France the Lion, Charles was first given a noble title by his brother Louis IX of France who succeeded to the French throne in 1226. Charles was named Count of Anjou and Maine; the feudal County of Anjou was a western vassal state of the Kingdom of France, which the Capetians had wrested from the House of Plantagenet only a few decades earlier. Charles married the heiress of the County of Provence named Beatrice of Provence, she was a member of the House of Barcelona; this meant Charles' holdings were growing as Count of Provence. After fighting in the Seventh Crusade, Charles was offered by Pope Clement IV the Kingdom of Sicily — which at the time included not only the island of Sicily but also the southern half of the Italian Peninsula. The reason for Charles being offered the kingdom was because of a conflict between the Papacy and the Holy Roman Empire, the latter of whom were represented by the ruling House of Hohenstaufen.

It was at the Battle of Benevento that the Guelph Capetians gained the Sicilian kingdom from the Ghibelline Swabians, this was cemented after victory at Tagliacozzo. In keeping with the political landscape of the period, Charles is described by scholars as shrewd, energetic and highly ambitious. He signed the Treaty of Viterbo in 1267 with Baldwin II of Courtenay and William II of Villehardouin, the political alliance gave many of the rights of the Latin Empire to Charles and a marriage alliance for his daughter Beatrice of Sicily. The Byzantines had taken back the city of Constantinople in 1261 and this was a plan to take it back from Michael VIII Palaiologos. It also recognised Charles' possession of Corfu and cities in the Balkans such as Durazzo, as well as giving him suzerainty over the Principality of Achaea and sovereignty of the Aegean islands aside from those already held by the Republic of Venice. For a while Charles was preoccupied helping his French brother in the unsuccessful Eighth Crusade on Tunis. After this he once again focused on Constantinople, but his fleet was wrecked in a freak storm off the coast of Trapani. With the elevation of Pope Gregory X, there was a truce between Charles and Michael in the form of the Council of Lyons, as Christians focused on improving ecumenical relations, with hopes of regaining the Kingdom of Jerusalem back from the Muslims.

Charles had fully solidified his rule over Durazzo by 1272, creating a small Kingdom of Albania for himself, out of previously Despotate of Epirus territory; he was well received by local chiefs.

Charles was driven out of Sicily in 1282, but his successors ruled Naples until 1435.

Charles II and division of the inheritance

This House of Anjou included the branches of Anjou-Hungary, which ruled Hungary (1308–1385, 1386–1395) and Poland (1370–1399), Anjou-Taranto, which ruled the remnants of the Latin Empire (1313–1374) and Anjou-Durazzo, which ruled Naples (1382–1435) and Hungary (1385–1386).

The senior line of the House of Anjou-Durazzo became extinct in the male line with the death of King Ladislaus of Naples in 1414, and totally extinct with the death of his sister Joanna II in 1435.

Branching out

Hungary

During the Middle Ages, there were several marriages between the Árpád dynasty and the House of Capet. Charles I, founder of the House of Anjou-Sicily, with his first wife, Beatrice of Provence fathered his eldest son, Charles II of Naples. (Their youngest daughter, Elizabeth was given in marriage to the future Ladislaus IV of Hungary in 1269, but Ladislaus preferred his mistresses to her, and the marriage remained childless). In 1270, Charles II married Mary of Hungary, daughter of Stephen V of Hungary and Elizabeth the Cuman. They had fourteen children which provided the House of Anjou-Sicily with a secure position in Naples.

The childless Ladislaus IV of Hungary (1262–1290), was succeeded by Andrew III as King of Hungary. He was the son of Stephen the Posthumous, considered by Stephen's much older half-brothers (Béla IV of Hungary, Coloman of Halych, Andrew II of Halych) a bastard son of infidelity. For this reason, after the death of Ladislaus IV. some of the Árpád dynasty's cognates sought the family as extinct. In Naples, Charles Martel of Anjou, the eldest son of Mary of Hungary announced his claim to the Hungarian crown, backed by his mother, and the Pope. He started to style himself King of Hungary, but he never managed to gain enough support from the Hungarian magnates to realize his claim.

With Andrew III's childless death (1301), the "last golden branch" of the tree of King Saint Stephen's family ended. The Hungarian diet was determined to keep the blood of Saint Stephen (first king of Hungary) on the throne in the maternal line at least. In the upcoming years, a civil war followed between various claimants to the throne. After the short period of rule of Wenceslaus of Bohemia (1301–1305), and Otto of Bavaria (1305–1307) the civil war ended with Charles Robert's (1308–1342) victory, the son of Charles Martel of Anjou, but he was forced to continue fighting against the powerful Hungarian lords up to the early 1320s.

I. Charles I of Anjou 1226/7–1285 king of Sicily(-Naples) = Beatrice of Provence
II. Blanche (died 1269) = Robert lord of Béthune
II. Beatrice 1252–1275 = Philip titular Latin Emperor of Constantinople
II. Elisabeth 1261–1303 = Ladislaus IV of Hungary
II. Charles II of Naples the Lame 1254–1309 = Mary of Hungary
III. Charles Martel (1271–1295), titular King of Hungary = Clemence of Austria
IV. Charles I (1288–1342), King of Hungary = 1. Maria of Galicia (?), 2. Mary of Bytom, 3. Beatrice of Luxembourg, 4. Elisabeth of Poland
V. (1.) Catherine (died 1355) = Henry II, Duke of Świdnica
V. (4.) Charles (1321–1321/3)
V. (4.) Ladislaus (1324–1329)
V. (4.) Louis I of Hungary (1326–1382) = 1. Margaret of Bohemia, 2. Elizabeth of Bosnia
VI. (2.) Catherine (1370–1378) 
VI. (2.) Mary of Hungary 1371–1395 = Sigismund of Luxembourg
VI. (2.) Jadwiga of Poland 1373/4–1399 = Władysław II Jagiełło
V. (4.) Andrew, Duke of Calabria (1327–1345) = Joanna I of Naples
VI. Charles Martel, Duke of Calabria (1345–1348)
V. (4.) Elizabeth (?) (b. 1327/1332) = Boleslaus II of Troppau
V. (4.) Stephen (1332–1354) duke of Slavonia = Margaret of Bavaria
VI. Elizabeth 1352–1380 = Philip II, Prince of Taranto, titular Emperor of Constantinople
VI. John (1354–1360), duke of Croatia, Dalmatia and Slavonia
V. Coloman (1317–1375), Bishop of Győr - illegitimate son with daughter of Gurke Csák 
IV. Beatrice (1290–1354) = Jean II de La Tour du Pin, Dauphin du Viennois
IV. Clementia of Hungary (1293–1328) = Louis X of France
III. Margaret (1273–1299) = Charles of Valois
III. Saint Louis of Toulouse (1274–1298), Bishop of Toulouse
III. Robert the Wise (1275–1343), King of Naples = 1. Yolanda of Aragon, 2. Sancia of Majorca
IV. (1.) Charles (1298–1328), Duke of Calabria, Viceroy of Naples = 1. Catherine of Habsburg (1295–1323), 2. Marie of Valois (1309–1332)
V. (2.) Eloisa (1325–1325)
V. (2.) Joanna I of Naples (1326–1382) = Andrew, Duke of Calabria (1327–1345)
V. (2.) Charles Martel (1327–1327)
V. (2.) Maria of Calabria (1329–1366) = 1. Charles, Duke of Durazzo 2. Robert of Baux, Count of Avellino 3. Philip II, Prince of Taranto
IV. (1.) Louis (1301–1310)
IV. (i.) Charles d'Artois c.1300–1346, grand chamberlain for Queen Joanna I - illegitimate with Cantelma Cantelmo 
IV. (i.) Maria d'Aquino (Boccaccio's Fiammetta) - illegitimate
IV. (i.) Helene - illegitimate = Andrea Thopia, Lord of Matija.
III. Philip I 1278–1331, Prince of Taranto and Achaea = 1. Thamar Angelina Komnene 2. Catherine of Valois–Courtenay
IV. (1.) Charles of Taranto 1296–1315, vicar of Romania
IV. (1.) Joan of Anjou 1297–1323 = 1.Oshin of Armenia 2. Oshin of Korikos
IV. (1) Margarete 1298–1340 = Walter VI, Count of Brienne titular duke of Athens
IV. (1.) Philip, Despot of Romania 1300–1330 = Violante (daughter of James II of Aragon)
IV. (1.) Maria 1301/4–1368, abbess in Conversano
IV. (1.) Blanche 1309–1337 = Ramon Berenguer infante of Aragon, count of Prades (son of James II of Aragon)
IV. (1.) Beatrice = Walter II of Brienne.
IV. (2.) Margaret c.1325–1380 = Francis de Baux duke of Adria
IV. (2.) Robert, Prince of Taranto 1326–1365, titular Latin emperor of Constantinople
IV. (2.) Louis, Prince of Taranto 1327/8–1362, king of Naples as husband of Joanna I of Naples
IV. (2.) Philip, Prince of Taranto 1329–1374, prince of Achaea, titular Latin emperor of Constantinople = 1. Maria of Calabria 2. Elisabeth of Slavonia
III. Blanche of Anjou (1280–1310) = James II of Aragon
III. Raymond Berengar (1281–1307), Count of Provence, Prince of Piedmont and Andria = Margaret of Clermont
III. John (1283–1308), a priest 
III. Tristan (1284–bef. 1288)
III. Eleanor of Anjou, (1289–1341) = Frederick III of Sicily
III. Maria of Naples (1290–c. 1346) = 1. Sancho I of Majorca, 2. Jaime de Ejerica
III. Peter Tempesta (1291–1315), Count of Gravina
III. John (1276–1335), Duke of Durazzo, Prince of Achaea, and Count of Gravina = 1. Matilda of Hainaut (1293–1336), 2. Agnes of Périgord (d. 1345)
IV. (2.) Charles, Duke of Durazzo (1323–1348) = Maria of Calabria
V. Joanna, Duchess of Durazzo 1344–1387 = 1. Louis, Count of Beaumont 2. Robert IV of Artois, Count of Eu
V. Agnes of Durazzo 1345–138 = Cansignorio della Scala lord of Verona 2. James of Baux
V. Margaret of Durazzo 1347–1412 = Charles III of Naples
IV. (2.) Louis, Count of Gravina (1324–1362) = Margaret of Sanseverino
V. Louis (1344–d. young)
V. Charles III (1345–1386), king of Naples (1382–1386) and Hungary (1385–1386) = Margaret of Durazzo
VI. Joanna II of Naples 1371–1435 = 1. William, Duke of Austria 2. James II, Count of La Marche
VI. Ladislaus of Naples 1377–1414 = 1. Costanza Chiaramonte, 2. Mary of Lusignan, 3. Mary of Enghien
V. Agnes (1347–d. young)
IV. (2.) Robert of Durazzo (1326–1356) 
III. Beatrice (1295–c. 1321) = 1. Azzo VIII d'Este, marchese of Ferrara, 2. Bertrand III of Baux, Count of Andria (d. 1351)
II. Philip 1256–1277, elected king of Sardinia - died childless
II. Robert 1258–1265 - died childless

The three surviving sons of Charles Robert (Charles I of Hungary) were Louis I of Hungary (1326–1382), Andrew, Duke of Calabria (1327-1345), and Stephen, Duke of Slavonia (1332-1354). Louis I had only two surviving daughters, Mary of Hungary (1371-1395), who married the future Holy Roman Emperor Sigismund of Luxembourg, and Hedwig of Poland (1373/74-1399), who was given in marriage to the Grand Duke of Lithuania Władysław II Jagiełło, the future King of Poland. (See the section of Poland.) After Louis I's death without male heirs, Mary's husband, Sigismund of Luxembourg (1368-1437) managed to be accepted as Mary's co-ruler, by the Hungarian lords. When the queen died (1395) the Hungarian crown passed over to the House of Luxembourg.

In 1333, the six years old second son of Charles Robert, Andrew (1327–1345) was taken to the court of Naples by his father for dynastic purposes, who put him under guardianship of Robert the Wise. Andrew was betrothed in 1334 to his cousin Joanna, granddaughter and heiress apparent of King Robert of Naples; Andrew's father was a fraternal nephew of King Robert. At the age of 15 he married Joanna I of Naples. After the death of Robert (1343), the King of Naples, Andrew became a victim of power clashes in the court of Naples.

Robert's claim to the throne was rather tenuous and did not follow primogeniture. Andrew's grandfather, Charles Martel of Anjou, had died young; therefore, the throne should have passed to Andrew's father. However, due to fears of impending invasion from Sicily, it was felt that a seven-year-old heir was too risky and would not be able to hold off invasions. The throne was offered to the next son of Charles II of Naples, Louis, but he refused on religious grounds, and it thus passed to Robert. To recompensate Andrew's father, Charles II decided to assign him the claim to Hungary.

When King Robert died in 1343, in his last will and testament, he formally bequeathed his kingdom to his granddaughter Joanna, making no mention of Andrew and thus denying him the right to reign along with Joanna. With the approval of Pope Clement VI, Joanna was crowned sole monarch of Naples in August 1344. Fearing for his life, Andrew wrote to his mother Elizabeth that he would soon flee the kingdom. She intervened, and made a state visit, before she returned to Hungary allegedly bribing Pope Clement to reverse himself and permit the coronation of Andrew.

Hearing of the Pope's reversal, a group of noble conspirators (the involvement of Queen Joanna is unproved) determined to forestall Andrew's coronation. During a hunting trip at Aversa, Andrew left his room in the middle of the night and was set upon by the conspirators. A treacherous servant barred the door behind him, and, as Joanna cowered in their bed, a terrible struggle ensued, Andrew defending himself furiously and shrieking for aid. He was finally overpowered, strangled with a cord, and flung from a window. Isolde, Andrew's Hungarian nurse took the Prince's corpse to the church of the monks, and remained with it until next morning mourning it. When the Hungarian knights arrived she told them everything in their mother tongue so no one else would learn about the truth, and soon they left Naples reporting everything to the Hungarian King.

The deed would taint the rest of Joanna's reign, although she was twice acquitted of any charge in the trials that followed. Andrew's elder brother Louis I of Hungary several times invaded the Kingdom of Naples and drove out Joanna, only to meet with reverses.

In November 1347, Louis set out for Naples with some 1,000 soldiers (Hungarians and Germans), mostly mercenaries. When he reached the border of Joanna’s kingdom, he had 2,000 Hungarian knights, 2,000 mercenary heavy cavalry, 2,000 Cuman horse archers and 6000 mercenary heavy infantry. Joanna in the meantime had married her cousin Louis of Taranto and had signed a peace with Naples' traditional enemy, the Kingdom of Sicily. The army of Naples, 2,700 knights and 5,000 infantrymen, was led by Louis of Taranto. On January 11, 1348, in the Battle of Capua, the king of Hungary defeated the army of Louis of Taranto. Four days later the queen repaired to Provence, while her husband followed soon afterwards. All the kingdom's barons swore loyalty to the new ruler as he marched to Naples from Benevento. While visiting Aversa, where his brother had been murdered, Louis had Charles of Durazzo assassinated in revenge by his condottiero. The Neapolitans, who had quickly grown unhappy with the severe Hungarian rule, called back Joan, who paid for her return expedition by selling her rights on Avignon to the popes. She landed near Naples and easily captured it, but the Hungarian commander Ulrich von Wolfart commanded a strong resistance in Apulia. Joanna and Louis would await a new trial on Andrew's assassination, to be held in Avignon. The verdict was Joanna's acquittal from any charge in January 1352, and a peace was signed with Hungary on March 23, 1352. Ultimately, 37 years later, Louis' kinsman Charles III of Naples conquered Naples with Hungarian aid and put Joanna to death.

Stephen of Anjou (1332–1354), Duke of Slavonia, the third surviving son of Charles Robert, died before his older brother. For this reason, he (and his son) had no chance to take over the rule neither in Hungary, nor in Poland. In 1350, he married Margaret of Bavaria. His marriage with a German princess made him unpopular in Poland. The Polish noblemen acknowledged Louis as Casimir III's sole heir in July 1351 only after he had promised that he would not allow Stephen to participate in the government of Poland. Margaret gave birth to a daughter Elizabeth (in 1370 she married Philip of Taranto), and a son John, who inherited Croatia, Dalmatia and Slavonia from his father, but he was still a child when he died in 1360.

On the death of Louis I of Hungary, Charles III of Naples, son of Louis of Durazzo (1324–1362), the great-grandson of Charles II of Naples and Mary of Hungary, claimed the Hungarian throne as the senior Angevin male, and ousted Louis' daughter Mary of Hungary in December 1385. It was not difficult for him to reach the power, as he counted with the support of several Croatian lords, and many contacts which he made during his period as Duke of Croatia and Dalmatia. However, Elizabeth of Bosnia, widow of Louis and mother of Mary, arranged to have Charles assassinated on 7 February 1386. He died of wounds at Visegrád on 24 February. His son, Ladislaus of Naples would try to obtain the crown of Hungary in the future, but never reached his goal.

Poland

In 1355, the last Piast king of Poland, Casimir III, designated his sororal nephew, the Angevin king Louis I of Hungary, as his heir presumptive by the Privilege of Buda. Upon the death of Casimir (5 November 1370), who left no legitimate sons, Louis ascended the Polish throne virtually unopposed. The Polish nobility welcomed his accession, rightly believing that Louis would be an absentee king who would not take much interest in Polish affairs. He sent his mother Elizabeth, sister of Casimir III, to govern Poland as regent. Louis probably considered himself first and foremost king of Hungary; he visited his northern kingdom three times and spent there a couple of months altogether. Negotiations with the Polish nobility frequently took place in Hungary. Hungarians themselves were unpopular in Poland, as was the king's Polish mother who governed the kingdom. In 1376, circa 160 Hungarians in her retinue were massacred in Kraków and the queen returned to Hungary disgraced. Louis replaced her with their relative, Vladislaus II of Opole.

The Hungarian-Polish union fell apart after Louis died in 1382. The dissatisfied Polish nobles demanded that his successor in Hungary, Mary, move to Kraków and reign over Hungary and Poland from there. Mary's mother, Elizabeth of Bosnia (widow of Louis and grandniece of Casimir III's father, Vladislaus I), knew that the lack of supporters would render her influence at least as restricted as that of her mother-in-law and refused to move. She abandoned the idea of attempting to subdue the Polish nobility by force and agreed to send her younger surviving daughter, Hedwig, to be crowned as Louis' successor in Poland.

Hedvig (known as Jadwiga in Poland) was crowned "king" in Poland's capital, Kraków, on 16 October 1384. Her coronation either reflected the Polish nobility's opposition to her intended husband, William, becoming king without further negotiation, or simply emphasized her status as queen regnant. With her mother's consent, Jadwiga's advisors opened negotiations with Jogaila, Grand Duke of Lithuania, who was still a pagan, concerning his potential marriage to Jadwiga. Jogaila signed the Union of Krewo, pledging to convert to Roman Catholicism and to promote his pagan subjects' conversion. Jogaila, who took the baptismal name Władysław, married Jadwiga on 15 February 1386. Jogaila, now in Polish styled Władysław Jagiełło, was crowned King of Poland on 4 March 1386. As Jadwiga's co-ruler, Jagiełło worked closely with his wife. Hedvig (or Jadwiga) was childless for over a decade. She became pregnant in late 1398 or early 1399. A newborn princess named Elizabeth Bonifacia was delivered on 22 June 1399 at Wawel Castle. However, the infant died after only three weeks, on 13 July 1399.[153] Jadwiga, too, was on her deathbed. She died on 17 July 1399, four days after her newborn daughter. Thus, the Polish throne went over to the Jagiellonian dynasty of Lithuanian origin. The union of Poland and Lithuania was a decisive moment in the histories of both countries; it marked a beginning of the four centuries of shared history. By 1569, the Polish–Lithuanian union grew into a new state, the Polish–Lithuanian Commonwealth, and lasted until the Third Partition in 1795.

Naples

Taranto

Kingdom of Albania

The Kingdom of Albania, or Regnum Albaniae, was established by Charles of Anjou in the Albanian territory he conquered from the Despotate of Epirus in the year 1271. He took the title of "King of Albania" in February 1272. The kingdom extended from the region of Durrës (then known as Dyrrhachium) south along the coast to Butrint. A major attempt to advance further in direction of Constantinople, failed at the Siege of Berat (1280–1281). A Byzantine counteroffensive soon ensued, which drove the Angevins out of the interior by 1281. The Sicilian Vespers further weakened the position of Charles, and the Kingdom was soon reduced by the Epirotes to a small area around Durrës. The Angevins held out here, however, until 1368, when the city was captured by Karl Thopia.

Genealogy of Capetian-Anjou

Titles

Designation and details

List of monarchs

Kingdom of Sicily

Kingdom of Naples

Kingdom of Hungary

Kingdom of Poland

References

Sources

External links 

 
Anjou
Hungarian royal houses
 
Hungarian nobility
Neapolitan royal houses
Italian nobility
Neapolitan nobility
Polish royal houses